Two ships of the Royal Navy have been named HMS Eglantine :

  an  sloop launched in 1917 and sold in 1921
 , a  launched and transferred to the Royal Norwegian Navy in 1941

Royal Navy ship names